Six Point Harness (6PH) is an American animation studio based in Los Angeles that develops and produces animated television programming, feature films, commercial, music videos and web-based content. Founded by Brendan Burch in 2003, some of the studio's most notable productions include Tom Hanks' Electric City, Fox's Cosmos: A Spacetime Odyssey, MTV's Good Vibes, Nick Jr.'s Wow! Wow! Wubbzy!, Nickelodeon's El Tigre: The Adventures of Manny Rivera, Adult Swim's Apollo Gauntlet and  Lazor Wulf, the animated feature The Drawn Together Movie: The Movie!, and the web series Dick Figures for the YouTube channel Mondo Media. 6PH also released Dick Figures: The Movie, an in-house production developed from the company's web series.

6 Point Harness uses employees and collaborators nationwide.

History 
Brendan Burch founded the studio in June 2003. In 2010, 6 Point Harness approached Mondo Media with a pitch for Dick Figures and arranged a partnership for the series;  6 Point Harness provided the financing and production while distribution was provided by Mondo Media.

In 2011, John Andrews came on board with the company to form 6 Point Media, the commercial branch of the studio. Six Point Harness and Titmouse, Inc. launched Rug Burn, a YouTube channel for animation, in 2012. Six Point Harness raised $313,411 through KickStarter to produce a feature-length episode of Dick Figures in 2012.

In 2013, the studio had two nominations for "Best Animated Web Series" for Dick Figures and Electric City at the Streamy Awards, with Electric City bringing the studio its first Streamy Award. That same year Dick Figures received an Annie Award nomination for Outstanding Achievement, Directing in an Animated Television or other Broadcast Venue Production.

Mondo Media and 6 Point Harness finalized a merger of their two companies in 2016. The company uses the Six Point Harness name for studio and production services, and Mondo Media branding for consumer-facing activities.

Six Point Harness provided the animation for the 2020 Oscar winning animated short Hair Love and produced an animated music video for the 2020 "Election Special" episodes of Black-ish.

Productions

Television

Films

Video games 
 Band Hero (cutscenes) (2009)
 Dark Souls III (animated trailer) (2015)

Web 
 Tire Fire Films (2006)
 Revisioned: Tomb Raider Animated Series ("Pre-Teen Raider") (2007)
 Larry Craig's Sexy Stall Tactics (2007)
 Read A Book (2008)
 Ghost Town by Shiny Toy Guns (music video) (2009)
 Dick Figures (2010–2015)
 CollegeHumor ("Realistic Superhero Funeral" and "Pizza Quest!") (2010–2011)
 The First Time I Ran Away by M. Ward (music video) (2012)
 Electric City (2012)
 Listing by Minus the Bear (music video) (2012)
 Nickelodeon Animated Shorts Program ("Austin Oliver", "Cabrito and Chewy", "Carrot and Stick" and "Bear Wrestler") (2012–2013)
 Rug Burn (2012–2016)
 We The Economy ("GDP Smackdown", "Taxation Nation" and "The Unbelievably Sweet Alpacas") (2014)
 Ninja Sex Party: Rhinoceratops vs. Superpuma (2014)
 SpindoTV (2015–2016)
 DreamWorksTV ("Lizzie") (2016)
 As Told By Emoji (2016–present)
 Minions (2017)
 HBO Backstories ("Insecure") (2019)
 The Birds & The Bees (2019)

References

External links 
 

American animation studios
Mass media companies established in 2003
2003 establishments in California